Matthew Thorburn is an American poet. He is the author of three books of poems, Subject to Change (New Issues, 2004), Every Possible Blue (CW Books, 2012) and This Time Tomorrow (Waywiser Press, forthcoming 2013), and a chapbook, Disappears in the Rain (Parlor City, 2009).

Life
Thorburn is a native of Michigan. He graduated from the University of Michigan, and The New School with an MFA. He lives in New York City.

He works on the business staff of an international law firm. He was one of the founders of Good Foot magazine, co-editing the journal from 2000 to 2004.

His poems have appeared in Poetry, The Paris Review, Prairie Schooner, Poetry Northwest, and The American Poetry Review, among other journals. He also regularly contributes book reviews to Pleiades.

Awards
 Dorothy Sargent Rosenberg Poetry Prize
 Belfast Poetry Festival’s Festivo Prize
 2008 Walter E. Dakin Fellowship at the Sewanee Writers’ Conference
 Fellowship from the New Jersey State Council on the Arts
 2008 Witter Bynner Fellowship from the Library of Congress
 2009 BRIO Fellowship from the Bronx Council on the Arts

Works

References

External links
 "Witter Bynner Poetry Reading", Library of Congress
 "Author's website"
 "Behind the Book: An Interview with Jay Leeming by Matthew Thorburn", Boxcar Review, May 2008

Year of birth missing (living people)
Living people
American male poets
University of Michigan alumni
The New School alumni
Chapbook writers